Patrick Palmer may refer to:

Sportspeople
Patrick Palmer (rugby union) (born 1988), Welsh rugby union player
Pat Palmer (rugby union) (born 1962), Canadian rugby player
Pat Palmer (boxer) (1914–1988), English boxer

Others
Patrick Palmer (British Army officer) (1933–1999), British Army general
Patrick Palmer (politician) (1889–1971), Irish Fine Gael politician from Kerry
Patrick Palmer (astronomer), American astronomer, Helen B. Warner Prize for Astronomy
Pat Palmer, the current owner of Citizendium